The Dawn Rider is a 1935 American Western film starring John Wayne and directed by Robert N. Bradbury.

The film was later released in a colorized version on home video/DVD under the title Cold Vengeance.

Plot
John Mason chases after his father's killer, an outlaw who remains elusive until he is tricked into revealing himself with a decoy gold shipment. To complicate matters, the killer is the brother of Alice, the woman with whom Mason has fallen in love. Alice begs Mason not to seek vengeance, but a showdown is inevitable.

Cast
 John Wayne as John Mason
 Marion Burns as Alice Gordon
 Dennis Moore as Rudd Gordon
 Reed Howes as Ben McClure
 Joseph De Grasse as Dad Mason
 Yakima Canutt as Saloon Owner
 Earl Dwire as Pete (Expressman)
 Nelson McDowell as Bates (Undertaker)

Remake
A 2012 remake of this film, entitled Dawn Rider, cast Christian Slater in the John Mason role.

See also
 John Wayne filmography
 List of American films of 1935

References

External links

 
 
 
 
 
 

1935 films
American black-and-white films
Films directed by Robert N. Bradbury
1930s English-language films
1935 Western (genre) films
Monogram Pictures films
American Western (genre) films
1930s American films